From Gasoline Alley to Another Country: Hits 2016 was a concert tour by British musician Rod Stewart in support of his twenty-ninth studio album Another Country.

Background
The tour began on 7 November 2016, in Prague, Czech Republic at the O2 Arena and continued throughout Europe, the United Kingdom and Ireland before concluding on 16 December 2016, in Glasgow, Scotland at the SSE Hydro Arena. Currently, the tour is planned to travel across Europe, the United Kingdom and Ireland with a total of sixteen shows.

Shows

Cancellations and rescheduled shows

References

External links
 Official Website

2016 concert tours
2017 concert tours
Rod Stewart concert tours